Jefferson Township is one of the twenty-two townships of Knox County, Ohio, United States.  The 2010 census found 633 people in the township.

Geography
Located in the northeastern corner of the county, it borders the following townships:
Knox Township, Holmes County - northeast
Richland Township, Holmes County - southeast
Union Township - south
Brown Township - west
Hanover Township, Ashland County - northwest

No municipalities are located in Jefferson Township.

Name and history
Jefferson Township was organized in 1829. It is named for Thomas Jefferson, third President of the United States.

It is one of twenty-four Jefferson Townships statewide.

Government
The township is governed by a three-member board of trustees, who are elected in November of odd-numbered years to a four-year term beginning on the following January 1. Two are elected in the year after the presidential election and one is elected in the year before it. There is also an elected township fiscal officer, who serves a four-year term beginning on April 1 of the year after the election, which is held in November of the year before the presidential election. Vacancies in the fiscal officership or on the board of trustees are filled by the remaining trustees.

References

External links
County website

Townships in Knox County, Ohio
1829 establishments in Ohio
Populated places established in 1829
Townships in Ohio